List of codenames of naval and land based operations in the Pacific Theater during World War II including Japan, Oceania, and the Pacific Rim.

Pacific Ocean

Axis
 A-Go (1944)  — Japanese plan to engage and destroy the U.S. Fleet during the Saipan landings
 AL (1942)  — Japanese invasion of the western Aleutians as a diversion from the attempted invasion of Midway Island
AOB (1942)  — Japanese seizure of Kiska Island
AQ (1942)  — Japanese seizure of Attu Island
 Ke-GO (1943)  — Japanese evacuation of Kiska, Aleutians
 I (1943)  — major Japanese air offensive to halt Allied advances on New Guinea and Guadalcanal
 FS (1944)  — proposal to isolate Australia by capturing New Caledonia, Samoa and Fiji.
 K-1 (1942)  — Japanese reconnaissance and air-raid on Pearl Harbor
 Ka (1942)  — Japanese plan to destroy the U.S. Fleet and recapture Guadalcanal
 Ke (1943)  — Japanese evacuation of Guadalcanal
 Ketsu-Go (Decisive) (1945)  — Japanese plans to counter US led invasion of Japan
 MI (1942)  — attempted seizure  of Midway Island
 MO (1942)  — aborted Japanese invasion of Port Moresby in New Guinea
 RE (1942)  — attempt to take Allied airfields on Milne Bay in New Guinea
 RO (1943)  — reinforcement of air forces at Rabaul
 Sho-Go (1945)  — Japanese naval reaction to US invasion of Leyte
 SR (1942)  — seizure  of Lae and Salamaua in southeast New Guinea
 TA (1944)  — attempt to repulse US bridgehead on Bougainville Island
 TEN (1945)  — air defence plan for Japan
 Ten-Go (1945)  — Japanese kikusui attacks and naval sortie to defend Okinawa.
 Z (1941)  — the Japanese attack on Pearl Harbor

Allies
 Baus Au (1942)  — plan to hide materiel in the Philippines before the fall for later use in guerilla warfare.
 Cartwheel (1943–1944)    — Allied thrusts in the South West Pacific Area, aimed at isolating the major Japanese base at Rabaul.
 Chronicle (1943)  — Allied landings at Woodlark Island and Kiriwina, New Guinea in support of Cartwheel.
 Toenails (1943)  — Allied landings at New Georgia.
 Postern (1943)   — Allied assault on Lae, Papua New Guinea.
 Goodtime (1943)  — New Zealand landing at Treasury Islands.
 Blissful (1943)  — US landing at Choiseul Island.
 Cherry Blossom (1943)  — US landing at Bougainville Island.
 Dexterity (1943–1944)  — Allied landings at Arawe, Cape Gloucester and Saidor and the capture of Tuvulu aerodrome.    — Allied assault on  New Britain
 Causeway (planned for 1945, not executed)  — planned US invasion of Formosa (Taiwan). Scrapped in favour of Operation Detachment (Battle of Iwo Jima).
 Cleanslate (1943)  — US landings on the Russell Islands
 Cottage (1943)   — US and Canadian operation to recapture Kiska in the Aleutians
 Cyclone (1944) — US airborne landings on Noemfoor, Dutch New Guinea
 Detachment (1945)  — US invasion of Iwo Jima
 Downfall (1945) — planned invasion of Japan
 Olympic (planned for 1945, not executed)  — first of two prongs of the invasion of Japan
 Coronet (planned for 1946, not executed)      — second of two prongs of the invasion of Japan
 Fall River (1942) — Allied reinforcement and airfield construction at Milne Bay, Papua New Guinea.
 Ferdinand (1942)  — coastwatchers on Japanese-occupied islands
 Flintlock (1944)  — US assault on Marshall Islands.
 Catchpole (1944)  — US invasion of Eniwetok
 Hailstone (1944) — naval air attack on Truk
 Forager (1944)  — US assault on Marianas Islands.
 Galvanic (1943)  — US assault on Gilbert Islands.
 Gratitude (1945)  — US Navy raid into the South China Sea
 Iceberg (1945)     — US invasion of Okinawa
 Inmate (1945)   — British and New Zealand naval bombardment of Truk
 Juneau (1945)  — US minesweeping operations at Okinawa.
 Lentil (1945)  — air attack by British Pacific Fleet on Pangkalan Brandan, eastern Sumatra
 Majestic (planned for 1945, not executed) — Planned Allied invasion of the Japanese Home Island of Kyushu. Scrapped in favour of Operation Olympic (under Operation Downfall)
 Meridian (1945) — air attack by British Pacific Fleet on Palembang
 Oboe (1945)   — Allied assault on Borneo.
 PM (1945) — removal of defensive minefield off Auckland, New Zealand
 Sandcrab (1943) — US operation to recapture Attu in the Aleutians
Starvation (1945)  — American aerial mining of Japanese ports and waterways.
 Stalemate (1944)  — US assault on Peleliu and Palau Islands
 Vengeance (1943)  — The assassination of Japanese Admiral Isoroku Yamamoto
 Watchtower (1942)  — U.S. invasion of Guadalcanal

See also
List of World War II military operations

External links 
 WW2DB: List of Axis Operations
 WW2DB: List of Allied Operations

Naval and land based operations in Pacific Theater
Pacific Theater, World War II